TV One is an American basic cable television channel owned by Urban One, having acquired Comcast's stake in the TV channel in 2015. Headquartered in Silver Spring, Maryland, TV One's programming targets African American adults with a broad mixture of original lifestyle and entertainment-oriented series, documentaries, films, music performances and reruns of sitcoms from the 1970s through the 2000s.

As of February 2015, TV One is available to approximately 57 million pay television households (48.9% of households with at least one television set) in the United States.

History

TV One launched on January 19, 2004, on Martin Luther King, Jr. Day, as a competitor to the longer-established BET. At the time of its launch, the channel was in approximately 2.2 million homes in 16 markets. On July 7, 2008, the channel's president and CEO Johnathan Rodgers announced that TV One would provide extensive coverage of the Democratic National Convention that August. In 2011, TV One's original co-owner Comcast acquired NBCUniversal, effectively integrating TV One and the other Comcast Entertainment Group channels into NBCUniversal's portfolio.

In August 2012, TV One updated its on-air look and logo, as part of a plan to "tell stories about how African-American life unfolds and to distinguish it from a growing number of competitors." On July 9, 2013, TV One announced that it would debut its first live one-hour, weekday morning news program that would be hosted by commentator Roland S. Martin. The program, News One Now, premiered on November 4, 2013.

In December 2014, Brad Siegel was hired as president of TV One. Siegel was formerly president of Turner Entertainment Networks, and vice chairman of Up TV,  which he co-founded in 2004.

In March 2015, Radio One announced a deal to buy out Comcast's 47.9% share of TV One for $550 million.

In February 2016, TV One updated their logo again, along with a new slogan: "Represent."

Membership and affiliations
 Associate member of the Caribbean Cable & Telecommunications Association, Inc. - CCTA

Programming

See also

 Aspire – an American digital cable and satellite channel owned by businessman and former basketball player Magic Johnson
 BET – The flagship American basic cable and satellite channel of the BET Networks, currently owned by Paramount Global, which launched in 1980 as the first television channel devoted to programming targeting African-Americans
 BET Her - A spinoff channel targeting African-American women
 Bounce TV – an American digital multicast channel owned by the E. W. Scripps Company
 Cleo TV - a sister channel to TV One targeting African-American women

References

External links

 
Urban One
Former Comcast subsidiaries
Television networks in the United States
Television channels and stations established in 2004
African-American television
African-American television networks